Marticville is an unincorporated community in Martic Township in Lancaster County, Pennsylvania, United States. Marticville is located at the intersection of Pennsylvania Route 324 and Frogtown Road.

References

Unincorporated communities in Lancaster County, Pennsylvania
Unincorporated communities in Pennsylvania